Triton is a Greek god of the sea, the son of Poseidon and Amphitrite, god and goddess of the sea respectively. Triton lived with his parents in a golden palace on the bottom of the sea. Later he is often depicted as having a conch shell he would blow like a trumpet.

Triton is usually represented as a merman, with the upper body of a human and the tailed lower body of a fish. At some time during the Greek and Roman era, Triton(s) became a generic term for a merman (mermen) in art and literature. In English literature, Triton is portrayed as the messenger or herald for the god Poseidon.

Triton of Lake Tritonis of ancient Libya is a namesake mythical figure that appeared and aided the Argonauts. Moreover, according to Apollonius Rhodius, he married the Oceanid of said region, Libya.

Sea god 
Triton was the son of Poseidon and Amphitrite according to Hesiod's Theogony. He was the ruler (possessor) of the depths of the sea, who is either "dreadful" or "mighty" according to the epithet given him by Hesiod.

Triton dwelt with his parents in underwater golden palaces. Poseidon's golden palace was located at Aegae on Euboea in one passage of Homer's Iliad 12.21.

Unlike his father Poseidon who is always fully anthropomorphic in ancient art (this has only changed in modern popular culture), Triton's lower half is that of a fish, while the top half is presented in a human figure.

Triton in later times became associated with  possessing a conch shell, which he blew like a trumpet to calm or raise the waves. He was "trumpeter and bugler" to Oceanus and Poseidon. Its sound was so cacophonous that when loudly blown, it put the giants to flight, who imagined it to be the roar of a dark wild beast.

The original Greek Triton only sometimes bore a trident. In literature, Triton carries a trident in Accius's Medea fragment.

Triton is "sea-hued" according to Ovid and "his shoulders barnacled with sea-shells". Ovid actually here calls Triton "cerulean" in color, to choose a cognate rendering to the original language; Ovid also includes Triton among other deities (Proteus, Aegaeon, Doris) of being this blue color, with green hair, as well describing the steed Triton rides as cerulean.

Libyan lake god 

There is also Triton, the god of Lake Tritonis of Ancient Libya encountered by the Argonauts. This Triton is treated as a separate deity in some references. He had a different parentage, as his father was Poseidon but his mother Europa according to the Greek writers of this episode.

This Triton first appeared in the guise of Eurypylus before eventually revealing his divine nature. This local deity has thus been euhemeristically rationalized  as "then ruler over Libya" by Diodorus Siculus.

Triton-Eurypylus welcomed the Argonauts with a guest-gift of a clod of earth which was a pledge that the Greeks would be granted the land of Cyrene, Libya in the future. The Argo had been driven ashore in the Syrtes (Gulf of Syrtes Minor according to some), and Triton guided them through the lake's marshy outlet back to the Mediterranean.

One of the works which recounts this adventure is Apollonius of Rhodes' Argonautica (3rd century BC), the first work in written literature that describes a Triton as "fish-tailed".

Triton with men and heroes 

In Virgil's Aeneid, book 6, it is told that Triton killed Misenus, son of Aeolus, by drowning him after he challenged the gods to play as well as he did.

Iconography of Triton duels 
Herakles wrestling Triton is a common theme in Classical Greek art particularly black-figure pottery, but no literature survives that tells the story. In fewer examples, the Greek pottery depicting apparently the same motif are labeled "Nereus" or "Old Man of the Sea" instead, and among these, Nereus' struggle with Herakles is attested in literature (Pseudo-Apollodorus, Bibliotheca). "Old Man of the Sea" is a generic term applicable to Nereus, who was also frequently depicted as half-fishlike. One explanation is that some vase painters developed the convention of depicting Nereus as a fully human form, so that Triton had to be substituted in the depiction of the sea-monster wrestling Herakles. And Nereus appears as a spectator in some examples of this motif.

In the red-figure period, the Triton-Herakles theme became completely outmoded, supplanted by such scenes as Theseus's adventures in Poseidon's golden mansion, embellished with the presence of Triton. Again, extant literature describing the adventure omits any mention of Triton, but placement of Triton in the scene is not implausible.

Further genealogy 

Triton was the father of a daughter named Pallas and foster parent to the goddess Athena, according to Pseudo-Apollodorus's Bibliotheca. Elsewhere in the Bibliotheca, there appears a different Pallas (Giant), a male figure overcome by Athena.

Athena bears the epithet Tritogeneia "Triton-born" and while this is suggestive of Triton's daughter being Athena, the appellation is otherwise explainable in several ways, e.g., as Athena's birth (from Zeus's head) taking place at the River Triton or Lake Tritonis.

Triton also had a daughter named Triteia. According to Pausanias writing in the 2nd century CE, one origin story of the city of Triteia held that this was an eponymous  city after Triteia, founded by her and Ares's son, named Melanippus ("Black Horse").

Tritons 

At some time during the Greco-Roman period, "Tritons", in the plural, came to be used a generic term for mermen.

Hellenistic and Roman art 

Greek pottery depicting a half-human, half-fish being bearing an inscription of "Triton" is popular by the 6th century BC. It has also been hypothesized that by this time "Triton" has become a generic term for a merman.

Furthermore, Tritons in groups or multitudes began to be depicted in Classical Greek art by around the 4th century BC. Among these is the work by Greek sculptor Scopas (d. 350 BC) which was later removed to Rome. The sirens of Homer's Odyssey were sometimes being depicted, not as human-headed birds but as tritonesses by around this time, as seen in a bowl dated  to the 3rd century BC, and this is explained as a conflation with Odysseus's Scylla and Charybdis episode.

Though not a contemporaneous inscription or commentary, Pliny (d. 79 CE) commented on the work that "there are Nereids riding on dolphins… and also Tritons" in this sculpture.

In later Greek periods into the Roman period Tritons were depicted as ichthyocentaurs, i.e., merman with a horse's forelegs in place of arms. The earliest known examples are from the 2nd century BC. The term "Ichthyocentaur" did not originate in Ancient Greece, and only appeared in writing in the Byzantine period (12th century); "Centaur-Triton" is another word for a Triton with horse-legs.

Besides examples in which the horse-like forelimbs have been replaced by wings, there are other examples where the forelegs have several clawed digits (somewhat like lions), as in one relief at the Glyptothek in Munich, Germany. A Triton with a lower extremity like a lobster or crayfish, in a fresco unearthed from Herculanum has been mentioned.

Double-tailed tritons began to be depicted by the late 2nd century BC, such as in the Altar of Domitius Ahenobarbus. Rumpf thought that might be the earliest example of a "Triton with two fish-tails (Triton mit zwei Fischschwänzen)". However the double-tailed tritonesses in Damophon's sculptures at Lycosura predates it, and even this is doubted to be the first example. Lattimore believed the two-tailed triton should be dated to the 4th century BC, and speculated that Skopas was the one to devise it.

As aforementioned, there is the female version of the half-human, half-fishlike being, sometimes called a "tritoness" or a "female triton".

Literature in the Roman period 

The first literary attestation of Tritons in the plural was Virgil's Aeneid. In the 1st century CE, another Latin poet Valerius Flaccus wrote in Argonautica that there was a huge Triton at each side of Neptune's chariot, holding the reins of horses. And Statius (1st century) makes a Triton figurehead adorn the prow of the Argo.

Trions and nereids appear as marine retinues to the goddess Venus in Apuleius's Metamorphoses, or "The Golden Ass".

Pausanias 
Tritons were described in detail in the 2nd century CE by Pausanias (ix. 21).

Pausanias was basing his descriptions on a headless Triton exhibited in Tanagra and another curiosity in Rome. These Tritons were preserved mummies or taxidermied real animals or humans (or fabrication made to appear as such). The Tanagran Triton was seen by Aelian who described it as an embalmed or stuffed mummy. While Pausanias related a legend around the Tanagran Triton that its head was cut off, J. G. Frazer conjectured that such a  had to be invented after a sea mammal's carcass with a severed or severely mutilated head was passed off as a Triton.

Renaissance Period  

Triton was referred to as "trumpeter of Neptune (Neptuni tubicen)" in Cristoforo Landino (d. 1498)'s commentary on Virgil; this phrasing later appeared in the gloss for "Triton" in Marius Nizolius's Thesaurus (1551), and Konrad Gesner's book (1558).

Triton makes appearance in English literature as the messenger for the god Poseidon. In Edmund Spenser's Faerie Queene, Triton blew "his trompet shrill before" Neptune and Amphitrite. And in Milton (1637), "Lycidas"  v. 89, "The Herald of the Sea" refers to Triton.

Gianlorenzo Bernini sculpted the "Neptune and Triton" fountain (1622–23) now in the Victoria and Albert Museum and the  Triton Fountain (1642–43) in Bernini Square, Rome. There is differing opinion on what earlier works he may have drawn from near-contemporary works or examples from antiquity. He may have been influenced by Battista di Domenico Lorenzi's Alpheus and Arethusa (1568–70) or his Triton blowing the conch (late 1570s), or Stoldo Lorenzi's Neptune fountain. But Rudolf Wittkower has cautioned against exaggerating the influences of Florentine fountains. It has been pointed out that Bernini had access to the Papal collection of genuine Greco-Roman sculptures, and worked with restoring ancient fragments, although it is unclear if any Triton was among these. It is within the realm of possibilities that Bernini might have used as his model the ancient Altar of Domitius Ahenobarbus, which does include Triton in its composition. The Triton of this altar, the Stoldo Lorenzi Triton and the Bernini Triton are all double-tailed, like a pair of human legs.

Victorian Age 

In Wordsworth's sonnet "The World Is Too Much with Us" (c. 1802, published 1807), the poet regrets the prosaic humdrum modern world, yearning for

glimpses that would make me less forlorn;
Have sight of Proteus rising from the sea;
Or hear old Triton blow his wreathèd horn.

Mascot 
There are numerous universities, colleges, and high schools and businesses that use Triton as their mascot. These include the following:
 University of California, San Diego, La Jolla, California
 Eckerd College, St. Petersburg, Florida
 Edmonds College, Lynnwood, Washington
 Iowa Central Community College, Fort Dodge, Iowa
 Mariner High School, Cape Coral, Florida
 Notre Dame Academy, Green Bay, Wisconsin
 San Clemente High School (San Clemente, California)
 University of Guam, Mangilao, Guam
 University of Missouri–St. Louis
 University of Rennes 1, Brittany France
Many club sports teams, especially swimming leagues, use the symbol of Triton.

 Drew Marine, a leading maritime company, also uses the symbol

Eponyms 
The largest moon of the planet Neptune has been given the name Triton, as Neptune is the Roman equivalent of Poseidon. A family of large sea snails, the shells of some of which have been used as trumpets since antiquity, are commonly known as "tritons", see Triton (gastropod).

The name Triton is associated in modern industry with tough hard-wearing machines such as the Ford Triton engine and Mitsubishi Triton pickup truck.

The USS Triton (SSN-586) was the only attack submarine of her class, and the only US Navy nuclear-powered submarine to have two reactors. She was decommissioned in 1969 and languished awaiting scrapping until 2007, which began at Puget Sound Naval Shipyard, and was completed as of 30 November 2009.

Explanatory notes

References 
Citations

Bibliography

External links 

Nereid and Triton Mosaic from Ephesus Terrace Home -2
3D stereoview of Nereid and Triton relief from Apollon Temple in Didim
TheoiProject: Triton Classical references to Triton in English translation
Warburg Institute Iconographic Database (ca 600 images of Tritons and other sea deities) 

 
Mermen
Greek sea gods
Greek legendary creatures
Children of Poseidon
Characters in the Argonautica
Deeds of Athena